Jill Bolte Taylor (born May 4, 1959) is an American neuroanatomist, author, and public speaker.

Taylor began to study severe mental illnesses because of her brother's psychosis. In the early 1990s, she was a postdoctoral fellow at Harvard Medical School, where she was involved in mapping the brain to determine how cells communicate with each other. On December 10, 1996, Taylor had a massive stroke. Her personal experience with a stroke and her subsequent eight-year recovery influenced her work as a scientist and speaker. It is the subject of her 2006 book My Stroke of Insight, A Brain Scientist's Personal Journey.  She gave the first TED talk that went viral on the Internet,, after which her book became a New York Times bestseller.

In May 2008 she was named to Time Magazine's 2008 Time 100 list of the 100 most influential people in the world. "My Stroke of Insight" received the top "Books for a Better Life" Book Award in the Science category from the New York City Chapter of the National Multiple Sclerosis Society in 2009.

Taylor founded the nonprofit Jill Bolte Taylor Brains, Inc., she is affiliated with the Indiana University School of Medicine, and she is the national spokesperson for the Harvard Brain Tissue Resource Center.

Stroke
On December 10, 1996, Taylor woke up to discover that she was experiencing a stroke. The cause proved to be bleeding from an abnormal congenital connection between an artery and a vein in the left hemisphere of her brain, an arteriovenous malformation (AVM). Three weeks later, on December 27, 1996, she underwent major brain surgery at Massachusetts General Hospital (MGH) to remove a golf ball-sized clot that was placing pressure on the language centers in the left hemisphere of her brain.

My Stroke of Insight
Taylor's February 2008 TED Conference talk about her memory of the stroke garnered widespread attention. It became the second most viewed TED talk of all time.

Following her stroke, Taylor published My Stroke of Insight: A Brain Scientist's Personal Journey, about her recovery from the stroke and the insights she gained into the workings of her brain because of it. Published in May 2008, it spent 63 weeks on the New York Times Bestseller List, reaching number 4.

Taylor appeared on The Oprah Winfrey Show on October 21, 2008. In her later commencement address at Duke University on May 10, 2009, Winfrey quoted Taylor's assertion that "You are responsible for the energy that you bring" and encouraged the students to assume this same responsibility in their future lives. Taylor was the first guest featured on Oprah's Soul Series podcast.

Ballet
Cedar Lake Ballet Company made a ballet about My Stroke of Insight called "Orbo Novo." Deborah Jowitt from The Village Voice wrote: "The piece's title, Orbo Novo, is drawn from a 1493 reference to North America by Spanish historian Pietro Martire d'Anghiera. The "new world" that Cherkaoui is exploring, however, is current theories about the brain, and the text that the seventeen dancers speak during the first moments of the 75-minute work comes from My Stroke of Insight, neuroanatomist Jill Bolte Taylor's uncanny recollection of her stroke. The choreography is based on the ramifications of a single resonant idea: the duality between rationality (the left brain) and instinctive, sensual responses (the right brain); between control and the lack of it; between balance and instability, solitude and society."

The Cecilia Chorus of New York
On May 3, 2019, on the occasion of Taylor's 60th birthday, the Cecilia Chorus of New York presented the world premiere of Fifty Trillion Molecular Geniuses at New York City's Carnegie Hall, setting text from My Stroke of Insight to the music of Johannes Brahms and Edward Elgar.

References

External links

 
 
 Jill Bolte Taylor on Oprah's Soul Series
 NPR radio interview
 In a Single Stroke: The Metamorphosis of Jill Bolte Taylor. O, The Oprah Magazine, October 2002
 Interview for the podcast Love + Radio

1959 births
Living people
American neuroscientists
Harvard Medical School alumni
Indiana State University alumni
Indiana University alumni
Indiana University faculty
People with hypoxic and ischemic brain injuries
American women neuroscientists
Writers from Louisville, Kentucky
Kentucky women in health professions
American women physicians
American women academics
21st-century American women